Norden Eh Huang (born 13 December 1937) is a Taiwanese-American Fluid dynamist known for the Hilbert–Huang transform.

Biography
Huang was born in Hubei, China in 1937. He attended National Hsinchu Senior High School in Taiwan and graduated from National Taiwan University in 1960 before earning a doctorate in fluid mechanics and mathematics from Johns Hopkins University in 1967. He completed postdoctoral research at the University of Washington, then held adjunct professorships at the University of Delaware and University of North Carolina while working for NASA. Huang returned to Taiwan and began teaching at National Central University in 2006, as K. T. Lee and TSMC Chair Professor.

Huang was elected a member of the US National Academy of Engineering in 2000 for contributions to the analysis of nonlinear stochastic signals and related mathematical applications in engineering, biology, and other sciences. He was also elected a member of the Taiwan's Academia Sinica in 2004 and a foreign member of the Chinese Academy of Engineering in 2007.

References

1937 births
Living people
Taiwanese mechanical engineers
20th-century Taiwanese engineers
NASA people
National Taiwan University alumni
Members of the United States National Academy of Engineering
Members of Academia Sinica
Academic staff of the National Central University
Johns Hopkins University alumni
Taiwanese emigrants to the United States
Foreign members of the Chinese Academy of Engineering
Taiwanese people from Hubei
Engineers from Hubei
American mechanical engineers
American people of Chinese descent